The Duchy of Samogitia was an administrative unit of the Grand Duchy of Lithuania from 1422 (and from 1569, a member country of the Polish–Lithuanian Commonwealth). Between 1422 and 1441 it was known as the Eldership of Samogitia. Since 1540s the Grand Duke of Lithuania also held the title of Duke of Samogitia, although the actual ruler of the province, responsible to the Grand Duke, was known as the General Elder of Samogitia who was self-elected by the Samogitian nobility.

The Duchy was located in the western part of the present Republic of Lithuania. Historically, in the west it had access to the Baltic Sea; in the north, it bordered the Duchy of Courland and Ducal Prussia in the south. During the Middle Ages and until the last partition in 1795, Samogitia had clearly defined borders as the Duchy of Samogitia. Afterwards the area encompassed the Samogitian Diocese. Today Samogitia is one of several ethnographic regions and is not defined administratively.

Name
Samogitia is a Latinized version of the name Žemaitija, meaning "the Lowlands" as opposed to Aukštaitija for "the Highlands". In the Middle Ages, the names Samaiten, Samaitae, Zamaytae, Samogitia, Samattae, Samethi were used in German and Latin sources. They, together with other variants Schmudien, Schamaiten (German) and Żmudź (Polish), are all derived from the Lithuanian Žemaičiai, dial. Žemaitiai / Žemaitei.

Geography

The Duchy was located in what today is several counties (apskritis) in Lithuania: a small part of Kaunas County (Kauno Apskritis), the western part Šiauliai County (Šiaulių Apskritis), Tauragė County (Tauragės Apskritis), Telšiai County (Telšių Apskritis), the northern part of Klaipėda County (Klaipėdos Apskritis) and the northern part of Marijampolė County (Marijampolės Apskritis).

The major part of Samogitia is located on Western Upland. Lowlands which are referred in its name are on the border between Samogitia and Eastern Lithuania, along the Nevėžis River.

The Duchy of Samogitia had the size of approximately 25,700 square kilometers.

History

 

Before the formation of the Lithuanian state, Samogitia was ruled by its local noblemen. A chronicle mentions two dukes from Samogitia in 1219 as signatories of the Treaty with Volhynia.

Since the formation of the Grand Duchy of Lithuania in the 13th century, Samogitia was its dependent territory, however sometimes the influence of the Lithuanian Grand Duke was very limited. During the rule of the first Lithuanian king, Mindaugas, Samogitians pursued an independent foreign policy and continued fighting with the Knights of the Sword even after King Mindaugas had signed a peace treaty with them.

Samogitia for 200 years played a crucial role in halting the expansion of the Teutonic Order and defeated the Knights of the Sword in the Battle of Saule (1236) and the Livonian Order in the Battle of Skuodas (1259), and the Battle of Durbe (1260).

In the atmosphere of fierce battles with the Teutonic Knights, the Lithuanian rulers Jogaila and Vytautas several times ceded Samogitia to the Teutonic Order in 1382, 1398 and 1404. However, the Teutonic Knights were not successful in subjugating the land, and Samogitians revolted in 1401 and 1409. After the defeats in the Battle of Grunwald (1410) and following wars, in 1422 the Teutonic Order ceded Samogitia to the Grand Duchy of Lithuania under the Treaty of Melno.

Samogitians were the last in Europe to accept Christianity in 1413. During the Christianization of Samogitia, none of the clergy, who came to Samogitia with Jogaila, were able to communicate with the natives, therefore Jogaila himself taught the Samogitians about the Catholicism, thus he was able to communicate in the Samogitian dialect of the Lithuanian language.

The Grand Duke of Lithuania Casimir Jagiellon acknowledged the autonomy of Samogitia in the Grand Duchy of Lithuania and then issued a privilege to the Eldership of Samogitia to elects its own elder (starost) in 1441.

Because of its prolonged wars with the Teutonic Order, Samogitia had developed a social and political structure different from the rest of Lithuania. It had a larger proportion of free farmers and smaller estates than in Eastern Lithuania.

As with most of the Polish–Lithuanian Commonwealth, Samogitia suffered in the aftermath of the Swedish invasion of Commonwealth (the Deluge, mid-17th century). Its population dropped from close to 400,000 to about 250,000; only to return to 400,000 by the late 18th century.

After the annexation of Lithuania by Imperial Russia, Samogitia was included in the Vilna Governorate (southern extreme was detached for New East Prussia and so on); in 1843 it was transferred to a newly established Kovno Governorate. At the beginning of the 19th century Samogitia was the center of the Lithuanian national revival, which stressed the importance of the Lithuanian language and opposed russification and polonization attempts.

Elders of Samogitia
The General Starosts of Samogitia (equivalents of voivodes) included:
Rumbaudas Valimantaitis (1386–1413) (?)
Mykolas Kęsgaila (1412–1432, 1440–1441, 1443–1450)
Jonas Kęsgaila (1451–1485)
Stanislovas Kęsgaila (1486–1527)
Stanislovas Kęsgaila (1527–1532)
Jan Radziwiłł (1535–1542)
Maciej Janowicz Kłoczko (1542–1543)
Jerzy Bilewicz (1543–1544)
Hieronim Chodkiewicz (1545–1561)
Jan Hieronim Chodkiewicz  (1563–1579)
Jan Kiszka (1579–1592)
Jerzy Chodkiewicz  (1590–1595)
Stanislaw Radziwiłł (1595–1599)
Jan Karol Chodkiewicz (1599–1616)
Hieronim Walowicz (1619–1636)
Jan Alfons Lacki  (1643–1646)
Jerzy Karol Hlebowicz  (1653–1668)
Aleksander Polubinski (1668–1669)
Wiktoryn Konstanty Mleczko (1670–1679)
Kazimierz Jan Sapieha (1681–1682)
Piotr Michał Pac (1684–1696)
Grzegorz Antoni Ogiński (1698–1709)
Kazimierz Jan Horbowski  (1710–1729)
Józef Tyszkiewicz (1742–1754)
Jan Mikołaj Chodkiewicz (1767–1781)
Antoni Giełgud (1783–1795)
Michał Giełgud  (1795–1808)

See also
Samogitian diocese
Samogitian language

Notes

External links
Samogitia
Zmudz/Samogitia

 
Former voivodeships of Grand Duchy of Lithuania
Principalities of the Grand Duchy of Lithuania
1219 establishments in Europe
1795 disestablishments in the Polish–Lithuanian Commonwealth
History of Samogitia